John Burton Thompson (December 14, 1810 – January 7, 1874) was a United States Representative and Senator from Kentucky.

Early life

Born near Harrodsburg, Kentucky, Thompson completed preparatory studies and studied law. He was admitted to the bar and practiced in Harrodsburg, becoming the Commonwealth's Attorney.

Political career

Kentucky Legislature
Thompson was elected to the Kentucky Senate in 1829 and served until 1833.  In 1835, Thompson was elected to the Kentucky House of Representatives where he served two, two-year terms.

House of Representatives
In 1840, Thompson was elected as a Whig to the United States House of Representatives to fill the vacancy in Kentucky's 5th District caused by the death of Simeon H. Anderson. He was subsequently reelected in 1842 and served until March 3, 1843. After a time out of Congress, he was again elected to represent the same district, serving this time from March 4, 1847 to March 3, 1851. During this time he was chairman of the U.S. House Committee on the Militia.

Lieutenant Governor

Thompson was the 14th Lieutenant Governor of Kentucky in 1852.

United States Senate
In 1852, Thompson was elected to the United States Senate as a member of the Know-Nothing party. He served from March 4, 1853 to March 3, 1859.

Death

Thompson died in Harrodsburg and was interred in Spring Hill Cemetery.

References

Notes

1810 births
1874 deaths
People from Harrodsburg, Kentucky
Whig Party members of the United States House of Representatives from Kentucky
Kentucky Know Nothings
Know-Nothing United States senators from Kentucky
Lieutenant Governors of Kentucky
Kentucky Commonwealth's Attorneys
Members of the Kentucky House of Representatives
Kentucky state senators